Lido may refer to:

Geography

Africa
 Lido, a district in the city of Fez, Morocco

Asia
 Lido, an area in Chaoyang District, Beijing
 Lido, a cinema theater in Siam Square shopping area in Bangkok
 Lido City, a resort in West Java owned by MNC Corporation

Europe
 Lido (Belgrade), a river beach on the Danube in Belgrade, Serbia
 Lidö, an island in the Stockholm Archipelago, Sweden
 Lido di Venezia, an 11-kilometre-long sandbar near Venice, Italy
 , a restaurant chain in Latvia founded by Gunārs Ķirsons
 Ruislip Lido, a reservoir and artificial beach in Ruislip, London, UK.

North America
 Di Lido Island, a neighborhood of the South Beach district of Miami Beach, Florida
 Lido Isle, Newport Beach, a man-made island, located in the harbor of Newport Beach, California
 Lido Key, a barrier island off the coast of Sarasota, Florida

Oceania
 Lido, Papua New Guinea, a village

Music
 Lido (musician), Norwegian producer
 Lido (Clearlake album), 2001
 Lido (Darren Hayman album), 2012
 Lido (EP), by The Colourist, 2013
 Lido, an album by Th' Faith Healers, 1992

Other
 Lido (swimming pool), a public swimming and lounge area
 Lido (typeface)
 Lido (Ueckermünde) or Strandhalle, a historic building, now used as a restaurant, in Western Pomerania, Germany
 Lido 14
 Le Lido, a cabaret and burlesque dance show establishment on the Champs-Élysées in Paris, France
 LIDO (Lightweight Information Describing Objects), an XML schema for describing objects in collections

See also
 
 
 Lido Beach (disambiguation)
 Lido Theatre (disambiguation)
 Ledo (disambiguation)